Inversive activities are processes which self internalise the action concerned. For example, a person who has an Inversive personality internalises his emotions from any exterior source. An inversive heat source would be a heat source where all the heat remains within the object and is not subject to any format of transference or externalisation.

Is the opposite of Transversive activities and objects which suggest by their very nature that the outcome is transferred to the secondary source.

Psychoanalytic terminology
Emotion